John Edmond (born 18 November 1936) is a Rhodesian folk singer and retired soldier who became popular in the 1970s for his Rhodesian patriotic songs.  He reached the height of his fame during the Rhodesian Bush War where he was sometimes known as the "Bush Cat".

Background
Edmond was born on 18 November 1936 in Luanshya, Northern Rhodesia (modern day Zambia) to a family of Scottish descent; during his childhood, he and his parents moved between Scotland and Central Africa. He went to school in Luanshya, Northern Rhodesia, Edinburgh, Scotland, and in South Africa at Christian Brothers College in Pretoria. He displayed a natural talent for music at an early age when he was given a mouth organ as a birthday gift from his grandmother at age three.  John mastered the instrument within half an hour.  As a Boy Scout, he played the bugle and was in the local Scout bugle band.  While at school in Edinburgh, he was chosen to sing in the famous St John's boys choir. He was regularly featured in lead roles at Christian Brothers College in Gilbert and Sullivan operettas. Edmond was lead drummer in the college's pipe band. He went on to win the South African Junior drumming championships at the Royal Scottish gathering at Wembley in 1953. After college, Edmond was employed at the Roan Antelope copper mine.

After some time there, Edmond joined Southern Rhodesia's Royal Rhodesia Regiment at Bulawayo. He served with the 3rd Battalion on the Congo border, in Nyasaland and Southern Rhodesia.  During this time, he bought a guitar at a trading store and met Bill Coleman while in the army. After learning to play the guitar with Coleman, Edmond formed the Bushcats Skiffle Group in 1958 along with two friends from the army, Eugene van der Watt and Ian Kerr. The group was a success among its peers and progressed into cabaret and rock 'n' roll. After his military service was up, Edmond went to England to study computers and moved to South Africa during the mid-1960s.  He became famous in Rhodesia during the Bush War with his album Troopiesongs. He was also a composer, writing such hits as "The UDI Song".  After the war, and Zimbabwean independence, he continued to record albums such as Zimsongs and Zimtrax.

In 1982, Edmond's label RAM published The story of Troopiesongs and the Rhodesian Bush War, a collection of lyrics for Troopiesongs, in Johannesburg.

Since 1987, Edmond and his wife Theresa have owned and maintained a resort in South Africa named "Kunkuru".  The resort is located in the Bela Bela area.  Edmond also has his own record label, Roan Antelope Music (RAM).

Discography

See also

Clem Tholet

References

1936 births
Living people
White Rhodesian people
People from Bulawayo
People from Luanshya
Rhodesia Regiment personnel
Rhodesian composers
Rhodesian drummers
Rhodesian guitarists
Rhodesian singers
Rhodesian people of British descent
South African folk musicians
South African male composers
South African guitarists
Male guitarists
20th-century South African male singers
21st-century South African male singers
Great Highland bagpipe players